The Netherlands was represented by Bill van Dijk, with the song "Jij en ik", at the 1982 Eurovision Song Contest, which took place in Harrogate, England on 24 April. The song and performer were chosen independently of each other at the Dutch national final on 24 February.

Although "Jij en ik" performed poorly at Eurovision and was forgotten immediately after, "Fantasie eiland", which had finished second in the Dutch national final, was picked up by British record producer Tim Friese-Greene, recorded in English (as "Fantasy Island") by the group Tight Fit, and became a top 5 hit in the UK and also a chart success in Ireland.

Before Eurovision

Nationaal Songfestival 1982 
The national final was held at the Circustheater in Scheveningen, hosted by the 1969 Eurovision winner Lenny Kuhr. It consisted of three acts and three songs, with each act performing each song, giving nine performances in total. Firstly, a seven-member jury, which included former Eurovision entrants Ben Cramer and Getty Kaspers (lead singer of Teach-In), each chose their favourite song; then the choice of performer was made by 12 regional juries who each had 10 points to divide between the artists.

At Eurovision 
On the night of the final van Dijk performed 16th in the running order, following Israel and preceding Ireland. The performance is mainly remembered for two incongruities: a famously self-conscious and uncomfortable wink at the camera by the female drummer, and the diminutive van Dijk's routine with an extremely tall female backing singer towering over him. At the close of voting "Jij en ik" had received just 8 points, placing the Netherlands 16th of the 18 entries, ahead only of Denmark and Finland. The Dutch jury awarded its 12 points to Cyprus.

The Dutch conductor at the contest was Rogier van Otterloo.

Voting

References

External links 
 Dutch Preselection 1982

1982
Countries in the Eurovision Song Contest 1982
Eurovision